Shady Hussien (born 1 May 1993) is an Egyptian professional footballer who plays as a forward for Egyptian League club Al Ahly.

Club career
On 12 September Al Ahly announced the signing of Shady from Ceramica Cleopatra on five years deal.

References

Living people
1993 births
Egyptian footballers
Footballers from Cairo
Egyptian Premier League players
Al Ahly SC players
Ceramica Cleopatra FC players
Association football midfielders
Association football forwards